The Room With No Doors is an original novel written by Kate Orman and based on the long-running British science fiction television series Doctor Who. It features the Seventh Doctor and Chris.

A missing scene, "Room With No Doors - Cutaway" appears in the charity anthology Shelf Life.
 
The novel features a Victorian time traveller, Penelope Gate. Later books in the BBC Eighth Doctor Adventures, such as Unnatural History (which Orman co-wrote) and The Gallifrey Chronicles, imply that she is the Doctor's human mother, whose existence is implied in the 1996 telemovie.

Summary
'Dear Doctor,' wrote Chris, 'I give up.'

Swordplay, samurai, demons, magic, aliens, adventure, excitement ... Who needs them?

The Doctor and Chris travel to sixteenth-century Japan, a country gripped by civil war as feudal lords vie for control. Anything could tip the balance of power. So when a god falls out of the sky, everyone wants it.

As villagers are healed and crops grow far too fast, the Doctor and Chris try to find the secret of the miracles — before two rival armies can start a war over who owns the god.

Chris soon finds himself alone — except for an alien slaver, a time-travelling Victorian inventor, a gang of demons, and old friend with suspicious motives, a village full of innocent bystanders, and several thousand samurai.

Without the Doctor, someone has to take up the challenge of adventure and stop the god falling into the wrong hands. Someone has to be a hero — but Chris isn't sure he wants to be a hero any more.

External links
The Cloister Library - The Room With No Doors(Link diverts to unrelated site as of January 2016)

1997 British novels
1997 science fiction novels
Virgin New Adventures
British science fiction novels
Novels by Kate Orman
Seventh Doctor novels
Fiction set in the 1560s